Miletich Fighting Systems (MFS) was a mixed martial arts (MMA) training organization. It was recognized as an excellent training camp. It has been the training camp for fighters such as Matt Hughes, Tim Sylvia, Jens Pulver, Robbie Lawler, and Jeremy Horn. MFS is widely regarded as one of the most successful MMA camps of all time.

Organization and structure
MFS traces its roots to 1997, when fighter Pat Miletich established one of the early MMA training schools at his Bettendorf, Iowa gym, Ultimate Fitness. 
The MFS Elite team has produced over 80 television and pay per view level athletes and 14 world champions in various organizations. In The UFC alone, 5 of this system's top students have become world champions in weight classes ranging from lightweight to heavyweight. Miletich himself, was the UFC's first ever lightweight champion (170 and below at the time).

According to the Las Vegas Sun, MFS has been defunct since 2008.

IFL fight team
Miletich Fighting Systems was one of the camps participating in the International Fight League. The Quad City Silverbacks were coached by former UFC Lightweight Champion and Miletech Fighting Systems founder Pat Miletich. The Silverbacks were the IFL team champions of the first 2 seasons. The IFL ceased to operate as a fighting league on July 31, 2008.

Notable fighters
Listed are some of the notable MMA fighters who have been produced by the Miletich camp.

Andre Roberts
Sam Hoger
Barb Honchak
Bart Palaszewski
Ben Rothwell
Brad Imes
Corey Hill
Dave Menne
Drew McFedries
Giovanni LaCognata
Ian Freeman
Jason Black
Jason Reinhardt
Jason Pierce 
Jens Pulver
Jeremy Horn
Josh Neer
Justin Eilers
LC Davis
LaVerne Clark
Mark Hughes
Matt Hughes
Mike Ciesnolevicz
Mike Whitehead
Robbie Lawler
Rory Markham
Spencer Fisher
Tim Sylvia
Tony Fryklund

References

External links
Pat Miletich, Miletich Fighting System Elite
Miletich FS on the GymDB

1997 establishments in Iowa
International Fight League
Mixed martial arts training facilities
Sports in the Quad Cities